The Carnelian Throne is a science fantasy novel by American writer Janet Morris. Published by Bantam Books in 1979, it is the fourth and final title of the Silistra series.

External links
 http://www.fantasticfiction.co.uk/m/janet-morris/carnelian-throne.htm
 http://www.goodreads.com/book/show/1539042.The_carnelian_throne

1979 American novels
1979 science fiction novels
1979 fantasy novels
Novels by Janet Morris
Bantam Books books